Stenogrammitis ascensionensis is a species of grammitid fern in the family Polypodiaceae. It is endemic to Ascension Island. Its natural habitats are introduced vegetation. It is threatened by habitat loss.

References

Polypodiaceae
Near threatened plants
Flora of Ascension Island
Taxonomy articles created by Polbot